{{Infobox Station
 | style=Amtrak
 | name=Provo, UT
 | image=Amtrak station provo utah.jpg
 | image_caption =Provo Amtrak station passenger shelter (view looking north from the track side)
 | address=300 West 600 SouthProvo, Utah
 | country=United States
 | line=
 | coordinates=
 | other=UTA FrontRunner Provo Central station very close by, which includes intra-county and local bus service
 | platform=1 side platform
 | tracks=2
 | structure=At-grade
 | parking=6 long term parking spaces
 | bicycle=
 | mpassengers = 
 | opened=24 May 2002
 | rebuilt=
 | ADA=Yes
 | code= 
 | owned=Union Pacific Railroad, except parking lot, which is owned by the City of Provo
 | zone=
|services=
|other_services_header=Former services
|other_services_collapsible=yes
 | other_services={{Adjacent stations|system1=Amtrak|line1=California Zephyr|left1=Salt Lake City (UP)|right1=Helper|note-left1=Until 1986|to-left1=16th Street
|line2=California Zephyr|left2=Salt Lake City (D&RGW)|right2=Helper|note-left2=1986-1999
|line3=Desert Wind|left3=Salt Lake City (D&RGW)|right3=Helper|note-mid3=Discontinued in 1997
|line4=Pioneer|left4=Salt Lake City (D&RGW)|right4=Helper|note-mid4=Before 1991 reroute
|system5=Denver and Rio Grande Western Railroad
|line5=Main Line|left5=Salt Lake City|right5=Thistle
|line6=Royal Gorge|left6=Salt Lake City|right6=Thistle}}
 | map_type= USA Utah#USA
 | map_caption = Location in Utah##Location in United States
 | map_dot_label = Provo
}}

Provo station is a train station in Provo, Utah. It is served by Amtrak's California Zephyr, which runs once daily between Chicago and Emeryville, California, in the San Francisco Bay Area.

Description
The station is located on the north side of the tracks and south of 600 South at 300 West. It is easily accessible from 200 West and has six paved parking spaces. There are no services provided at the station (i.e., ticketing, restrooms, lounge, etc.).  The station is within walking distance of downtown Provo. The station is located within a Quiet Zone, so all trains (including Utah Transit Authority's FrontRunner and Union Pacific's) do not routinely sound their horns when approaching public crossings within this corridor although they do sound their bells.

Even though UTA's FrontRunner commuter rail line uses the same right-of-way through downtown Provo that is used by the California Zephyr, UTA built a separate station of the same name. That station is located one block east on the south side of the tracks. However, there is easy pedestrian access between the two stations and the UTA connecting intra-county and local bus routes. The FrontRunner provides commuter rail service north to Salt Lake City and Ogden, and stops in between.

History
The station is on the site of a previous station constructed by the Denver and Rio Grande Western Railroad in 1910. This building remained in use until 1986 when, increasingly dilapidated, it was demolished.

The station was little more than a plexiglas bus shelter along the tracks until 2002, when it was replaced by three decorative shelters, one of which is mostly enclosed and heated.  The new station opened 14 May 2002 and cost $120,000 with funds coming from Provo City, Amtrak, and a federal grant.  In-kind contributions were also provided by Provo City.

Beginning in 1983, both the Desert Wind (with service from Chicago to Los Angeles) and the Pioneer (with service from Chicago to Seattle) previously stopped at the Provo Station. Service by the Pioneer was dropped when that train was rerouted through Wyoming in 1991 (the train was later discontinued altogether in 1997). Service by the Desert Wind ended when Amtrak discontinued that train in 1997 (at the same time as the Pioneer was discontinued). Although the ultimate western end of the line for the Desert Wind'' was in Los Angeles (southwest of the Provo Station), the train route ran north to Salt Lake City before heading south to its next stop in Milford, Utah (Delta from 1983 to 1988).

Notes

References

External links

Provo Amtrak Station (USA RailGuide -- TrainWeb)

Amtrak stations in Utah
Buildings and structures in Provo, Utah
Railway stations in the United States opened in 2002
Former Denver and Rio Grande Western Railroad stations
2002 establishments in Utah
Railway stations in Utah County, Utah